Thomas Bos (born 5 July 1968) is a retired speed skater from the Netherlands who was active between 1987 and 1993. In 1992, he set a new world record in the 3000 m. The same year he competed in 10000 m at the 1992 Winter Olympics and finished in 11th place. He won the same event at the national championships in 1990 and finished second in 1989 and third in 1992. His best all round achievement was a bronze medal at the national championships in 1990 and fourth place at the world championships in 1991.

Personal bests:
   500 m – 0:38.52 (1992)
 1000 m – 1:15.02 (1992)
 1500 m – 1:53.16 (1992)
 5000 m – 6:44.24 (1992)
 10000 m – 13:54.99 (1992)

References

1968 births
Living people
Dutch male speed skaters
Olympic speed skaters of the Netherlands
Speed skaters at the 1992 Winter Olympics
Sportspeople from The Hague